The 2017 season for the  cycling team began in January at the Tour Down Under. As a UCI WorldTeam, they were automatically invited and obligated to send a squad to every event in the UCI World Tour.

Team roster

Riders who joined the team for the 2017 season

Riders who left the team during or after the 2016 season

Season victories

Footnotes

References

External links
 

2017 road cycling season by team
Lotto–Soudal
2017 in Belgian sport